Henry Vernon Wong is a Jamaican-American physicist known for his work in Plasma physics. He is Professor Emeritus at the University of Texas, Austin.

Career 
Wong's early education was at Cornwall College in Montego Bay, Jamaica. He won a Jamaica Scholarship to the University of the West Indies, graduating with a B.Sc. in physics in 1961. He obtained his D.Phil. in Nuclear physics from Wadham College, Oxford in 1964. Wong remained at Oxford during 1964–1965 as a postdoctoral scholar. In 1965, he was the recipient of a CIBA Fellowship to continue his research at the International Centre for Theoretical Physics in Trieste, Italy. The following year he joined the Laboratoria Gas Ionizzati in Rome. In 1967, Wong joined the Fusion Research Center (FRC) of the University of Texas at Austin as a Research Scientist.

Awards and honors
In 1961, Wong was awarded a Rhodes Scholarship to Wadham College, Oxford
In 1988, He was elected fellow of the American Physical Society.

Selected publications
Wong, H. Vernon. "Stability of Bernstein‐Greene‐Kruskal Wave with Small Fraction of Trapped Electrons" The Physics of Fluids 15, 632 (1972); DOI:10.1063/1.1693958
Wong, H. Vernon. "Sideband instabilities in free electron lasers" Physics of Fluids B: Plasma Physics, 2 1635 (1990). DOI:10.1063/1.859489
Wong, H. Vernon. "Particle canonical variables and guiding center Hamiltonian up to second order in the Larmor radius" Physics of Plasmas 7, 73 (2000). DOI:10.1063/1.873782
Wong, H. Vernon. "Nonlinear finite-Larmor-radius drift-kinetic equation" Physics of Plasmas 12, 112305 (2005). DOI:10.1063/1.2116867

References 

University of the West Indies alumni
Alumni of the University of Oxford
Alumni of Wadham College, Oxford
Living people
20th-century American physicists
21st-century American physicists
Jamaican scientists
Jamaican Rhodes Scholars
Plasma physicists
Fellows of the American Physical Society
University of Texas at Austin faculty
1938 births
Cornwall College, Jamaica alumni